This is a list of Social Democratic Party MPs.  It includes all Members of Parliament elected to the British House of Commons representing the Social Democratic Party.  Members of the Scottish Parliament or the European Parliament are not listed.

Bruce Douglas-Mann, Labour Party MP for Mitcham and Morden, is not included as immediately on his change of allegiance he stood down, forcing a by-election, which he lost.

1 Joined David Owen's Social Democratic Party in 1988, then became an Independent Social Democrat MP from 1990 - 92.
2 Sitting Labour Party MP who joined the SDP.
3 Sitting Conservative Party MP who joined the SDP.
4 Later elected as a Liberal Democrat MP.
5 Later elected as a Conservative MP.
6 Previously elected as a Labour MP.
7 Joined the Liberal Democrats on their formation in 1988.
8 Subsequently left the SDP to sit as an independent Labour MP.

Graphical representation (1981-88) 
Also includes the continuing SDP from 1988.

See also
 Social Democratic Party election results

Social Democratic Party